Rocco Sabato (born 19 April 1982) is an Italian former footballer who last played for Maceratese in the Serie D. He played as a defender, usually at left-back.

He was a set piece specialist and scored his first Serie A goal from a free-kick with Calcio Catania during the 2008–09 season.

Career

A.C. Pavia
Sabato began his professional footballing career with A.C. Pavia, following his transfer from his youth club,  During the 2000–01 Serie D season, Sabato managed to make 28 full appearances in his first season. After just one season with the club, he was sold to U.S. Fiorenzuola 1922.

U.S. Fiorenzuola
The young defender then transferred to U.S. Fiorenzuola 1922, in 2001, and again managed to hold a place in the club's starting XI. He made 30 appearances in his first season, playing mostly as a left back, and even managed a goal, which was the first of his professional career. Following his impressive form in the lower divisions of Italian football, he was sold to Cosenza Calcio 1914 prior to the start of the 2002–03 Serie B season.

Cosenza Calcio 1914
He officially transferred to Cosenza in July 2002, and was set for his first season in the Italian Serie B. Following his debut, Sabato went on to make an additional 16 appearances, and his displays  He soon transferred to another Serie B side, Cagliari Calcio for an undisclosed fee. Cosenza was expelled from professional league on 31 July.

Cagliari Calcio
After officially joining the Sardinian club in July 2003, he became a key member of the team for much of the campaign and made 21 first team appearances in the league alone, and helped the team to Serie A promotion for the 2004–05 Serie A season. He did not appear much for the club, in his first Serie A season, and made his Serie A debut on 27 February 2005, as a starter against Atalanta B.C. The match ended in a 3–3 draw. Following his debut, he played in just two more games for the entire season. Following an entire season in Serie A, that saw the left sided defender make just three appearances, he was sold to another island club, Calcio Catania, ahead of the 2005–06 Serie B season. With this transfer, his first Serie A experience was very short-lived.

Calcio Catania
Calcio Catania officially announced the co-ownership transfer on 7 July 2005, and the player was imminently a part of the rossazzuri's season. He managed to make 23 league appearances, and helped to guide the team to a very impressive second-place finish in the league table, and hence to Serie A promotion. In June 2006 Catania signed Sabato outright from Cagliari for an undisclosed fee.

Despite being a part of coach Pasquale Marino's plans during his first season in Sicily, the player was instantly loaned out prior to the new Serie A adventure. He was loaned back into the Italian Serie B, with A.C. Cesena, for the 2006–07 campaign, for a fee of €75,000. It was a very successful loan spell, however, as the player was a fixture in the team's starting line-up for much of the season, making 32 league appearances, and also netting a goal.

Upon his return to Catania, following the expiration of the loan deal, Sabato remained in Sicily for the 2007–08 Serie A season, under coach Silvio Baldini. Under Baldini, the player was used often, and made 19 appearances in the league, helping guide the team to salvation against relegation for the second consecutive season. Sabato again remained in Catania for the 2008–09 Serie A season, under another new coach, Walter Zenga. The left back was used just seven times, however in the first portion of the season, and did manage his first Serie A goal, from a free kick, but he was still released as a free agent during the winter transfer market.

Empoli F.C.
On 30 January 2009, Sabato officially joined the second division club, and instantly earned a starting position with the club. In the latter portion of the 2008–09 Serie B season, alone, Sabato made an impressive 15 appearances. Despite a fairly good start to his adventure with Empoli, the player was surprisingly sold to fellow Serie B club, Triestina, on 14 July 2009.

U.S. Triestina Calcio
With Triestina, the player signed a two-year contract, following his arrival in July 2009. In his first season with the Trieste based club, Sabato was a key figure in the team's starting line-up, and made 33 Serie B appearances during the 2009–10 season. Despite his efforts, the club failed to avoid relegation, as they lost the play-off match versus Padova, following an 18th-place finish in the league table.

Sorrento Calcio
On 31 January 2011 he was transferred to Sorrento and went on to make 22 appearances.

Outside of football
On 5 January 2005, Cagliari retired former club legend Luigi Riva's number 11 jersey to honour him and his achievements with the club; as the last holder of the number 11 shirt, Rocco Sabato presented Riva with his jersey in the club's official ceremony.

References

External links
 (2004–2010)
 (2007–2011)

1982 births
Living people
People from Potenza
Italian footballers
Serie A players
Serie B players
Serie C players
Serie D players
U.S. Fiorenzuola 1922 S.S. players
Cosenza Calcio 1914 players
Cagliari Calcio players
Catania S.S.D. players
A.C. Cesena players
Empoli F.C. players
U.S. Triestina Calcio 1918 players
A.S.D. Sorrento players
Pisa S.C. players
F.C. Pavia players
S.S. Maceratese 1922 players
Association football defenders
Sportspeople from the Province of Potenza
Footballers from Basilicata